Morauta House is an office complex in Waigani, Port Moresby, Papua New Guinea. It is located close to Parliament House, and houses the executive offices of the Prime Minister of Papua New Guinea. It is named after Mekere Morauta, who was, at the time of construction, a long-serving Secretary for Finance, and who some years later went on to become Prime Minister of Papua New Guinea.

Buildings and structures in Port Moresby